Cliff Walkers, previously titled Impasse in English, is a 2021 Chinese historical spy thriller film directed by Zhang Yimou and written by Quan Yongxian. It is set in the Imperial Japanese puppet state of Manchukuo in the 1930s before World War II erupts. It was selected as the Chinese entry for the Best International Feature Film at the 94th Academy Awards.

Plot 
Set in the Japanese puppet state of Manchukuo, the film follows four Chinese Communist Party agents who parachute back to Harbin in Northeastern China in the early 1930s.  Together, they embark on a secret operation code-named “Utrennya” that intends to extract a former prisoner who could expose the unethical human experimentation and other crimes against humanity committed by Unit 731 of the Imperial Japanese Army in front of the international community. Upon landing, the team members split into two groups to avoid being captured and tortured to sell out their loved ones on the other group. They are also ready to sacrifice themselves by ingesting cyanide-equivalent pills contained in a match box. Soon after their separation, group 1 discover their local contacts are disguised by enemies. They manage to escape the trap, but also realize they had been sold out by a traitor, who caved after being tortured and witnessing the execution of his fellow comrades. Will group 1 be able to inform group 2 and carry out the mission? That is the question on the snowy grounds of Manchukuo.

Cast 
 Zhang Yi as Zhang Xianchen, a former journalist-turned CCP agent
 Yu Hewei as Zhou Yi, a CCP agent embedded within the enemy
 Qin Hailu as Wang Yu, Zhang's wife and comrade
 Zhu Yawen as Chu Liang, Zhang's comrade
 Liu Haocun as Xiao Lan, Zhang's comrade and Chu's girlfriend 
 Ni Dahong as Gao Bin, enemy in charge
 Li Naiwen as Gao's henchman
 Yu Ailei as Jin Zhide, Gao's henchman
 Lei Jiayin as Xie Zirong, a CCP agent-turned traitor

Production 
A conceptual poster was released in October 2019 during Pingyao International Film Festival. On Dec 13, 2019, the cameras started rolling in Xuexiang National Forest Park. The shooting wrapped on May 19, 2020.

The original score was composed by Jo Yeong-wook, whereas the eponymous theme song is composed by the band RadioMars and performed by Zhou Shen.

Release 
The movie was released on April 30, 2021 in both China and the United States. In China, it is released in IMAX, CINITY, Dolby Cinema, etc. In the United States, it is distributed by China Media Capital.

Reception 
Cliff Walkers received a 82% positive rating on Rotten Tomatoes, with an average rating of 6.7/10.

Awards and nominations

See also
 List of submissions to the 94th Academy Awards for Best International Feature Film
 List of Chinese submissions for the Academy Award for Best International Feature Film

References

External links 
 
 
 
 
 Cliff Walkers at filmaffinity.com
 Cliff Walkers at hkmdb.com
 Cliff Walkers at rogerebert.com

2020s Mandarin-language films
Chinese war drama films
2021 war drama films
Films shot in China
Films directed by Zhang Yimou
Films set in Manchukuo
Films set in Heilongjiang